The 1998 NCAA Division II Lacrosse Championship was the 14th annual tournament to determine the national champions of NCAA Division II men's college lacrosse in the United States.

The final, and only match of the tournament, was played at Yurcak Field at Rutgers University in Piscataway, New Jersey. 

Adelphi defeated C.W. Post in the championship game, 18–6, to claim the Panthers' fifth Division II national title.

Bracket

See also
1998 NCAA Division I Men's Lacrosse Championship
1998 NCAA Division I Women's Lacrosse Championship
1998 NCAA Division III Men's Lacrosse Championship

References

NCAA Division II Men's Lacrosse Championship
NCAA Division II Men's Lacrosse Championship
NCAA Division II Men's Lacrosse